The 1978 Alabama Crimson Tide football team (variously "Alabama", "UA" or "Bama") represented the University of Alabama in the 1978 NCAA Division I-A football season. It was the Crimson Tide's 84th overall and 45th season as a member of the Southeastern Conference (SEC). The team was led by head coach Bear Bryant, in his 21st year, and played their home games at Bryant–Denny Stadium in Tuscaloosa and Legion Field in Birmingham, Alabama. They finished season with eleven wins and one loss (11–1 overall, 6–0 in the SEC), as SEC champions and as national champions after a victory over Penn State in the Sugar Bowl. Alabama's costumed "Big Al" mascot officially debuted this season, appearing at the Sugar Bowl.

Schedule

Personnel

Before the season
Alabama ended the 1977 season with the disappointment of a #2 finish, an 11-point voting margin behind national champion Notre Dame.

On April 13, 1978, Paul Bryant was one of several coaches quoted in an AP interview that focused on efforts to rid college football of cheating. Bryant advocated a rule requiring coaches notify the NCAA of suspected infractions immediately and getting it over with rather than complaining after losing a game.

On April 20, nearly a dozen players with injuries were held out of the annual A-Day game that ended in a colorless 7-7 tie. The biggest concern was a knee injury to second-string QB Steadman Shealy. Bryant, in the post A-Day game press conference, declared his 1978 team would have "a questionable offense, an average kicking game, and a good defense" in the post-A-Day game press conference. Lastly a newcomer who was recruited four years ago but decided to pursue other athletics adventures started as outside linebacker from Richmond Virginia, Eddie McGeorge.

Sugar Bowl
The 1979 Sugar Bowl against Penn State would go down as a classic. Alabama scored in the second quarter, then Penn State answered in the third, then Alabama took a 14–7 lead on a touchdown set up by a 62-yard punt return.  Penn State had a chance to tie in the fourth, but quarterback Chuck Fusina threw an interception into the Alabama end zone.  Then Alabama had a chance to put the game away, but fumbled the football back to Penn State at the Nittany Lion 19-yard-line with four minutes to go.  Penn State drove to a first and goal at the Alabama eight.  On third and goal from the one, Fusina asked Bama defensive lineman Marty Lyons "What do you think we should do?", and Lyons answered "You'd better pass."  On third down, Penn State was stopped inches short of the goal line.  On fourth down, Penn State was stopped again, Barry Krauss meeting Mike Guman and throwing him back for no gain.  Alabama held on for a 14–7 victory.  The Crimson Tide split the national championship, winning the AP poll while Southern California won the UPI Coaches' poll.  It was Alabama's fifth wire service national championship.

References
General

 
 

Specific

Alabama
Alabama Crimson Tide football seasons
College football national champions
Southeastern Conference football champion seasons
Sugar Bowl champion seasons
Alabama Crimson Tide football